The Băiceni is a right tributary of the river Dresleuca in Romania. It flows into the Dresleuca near Curtești.

References

Rivers of Romania
Rivers of Botoșani County